Boston (also known as Druim na Doimhne) is a village in north County Clare, Ireland. It is situated off R460 the Corofin to Gort regional road, at the northeastern edge of the Burren National Park, and close to the border with County Galway. The village is situated in the parish of Kilkeedy, the main settlement of which is the County Clare portion of the village of Tubber. 

The name Boston is most likely to have been originally a nickname or ironic reference to what was described in 1839 as "a few cabins situated on the property of the Marquis of Thomond", while the Irish name, Móinín na gCloigeann ("little meadow or bog of the skulls"), appears to be a mistaken transfer from that of another place, also called Boston in English, near Cratloe in the south of the county.

The ruins of Cluain Dubháin Castle and Skaghard Castle can be found near Lough Bunny. Today, the ruins of the castle are a reminder of the past sieges endured by its previous occupants. Mahon O'Brien defended the castle for three months, before being killed by a musket ball during a siege of the castle laid by Richard Bingham in 1586.

See  also
 List of towns and villages in Ireland

References

Towns and villages in County Clare